Eugene Levitt (May 28, 1920 – November 15, 1999) was an American television writer, producer and director.

Life and career
Levitt was born in Brooklyn, New York, the son of Charles and Teresa Levitt. He had an older sister, Betty Ruth. His mother died when Gene was about 12 years old. Levitt attended the University of Wyoming. Following graduation he moved to Chicago where he worked as a newspaper reporter until enlisting in the United States Marine Corps.

In the 1940s, Levitt wrote for radio programs, including The Adventures of Philip Marlowe.

Levitt was a writer for many television series in the 1950s and 1960s, including Highway Patrol, Maverick ("Trail West to Fury"), Adventures in Paradise and Combat!. He moved to directing in the 1970s, working on series such as Alias Smith and Jones and McCloud. His most significant achievement was the creation of the television series Fantasy Island, starring Ricardo Montalbán and Herve Villechaize. The show ran for over six years.

In addition to Fantasy Island, Levitt assisted in the writing, production, and directing of Hawaii-Five-O, and Alias Smith and Jones.

He died of prostate cancer in Los Angeles, California.

Filmography

Films

Television

See also

References

External links
 

1920 births
1999 deaths
20th-century American businesspeople
American television directors
American television producers
American television writers
Deaths from cancer in California
Deaths from prostate cancer
American male television writers
United States Marine Corps officers
20th-century American screenwriters
United States Marine Corps personnel of World War II
20th-century American male writers
University of Wyoming alumni